Phyllonorycter pseudojezoniella is a moth of the family Gracillariidae. It is known from the Russian Far East.

The larvae feed on Quercus mongolica and Quercus serrata. They probably mine the leaves of their host plant.

References

pseudojezoniella
Moths of Asia
Moths described in 1994